Zia-ul-Haq is an Afghan cricketer. He made his List A debut for Speen Ghar Region in the 2017 Ghazi Amanullah Khan Regional One Day Tournament on 11 August 2017. He made his first-class debut for Band-e-Amir Region in the 2017–18 Ahmad Shah Abdali 4-day Tournament on 20 October 2017, scoring a century in the first innings.

In the final of the 2018 Ahmad Shah Abdali 4-day Tournament, he was named the man of the match. He also finished the tournament as the leading run-scorer for Band-e-Amir Region, with 714 runs in nine matches.

References

External links
 

Year of birth missing (living people)
Living people
Afghan cricketers
Band-e-Amir Dragons cricketers
Spin Ghar Tigers cricketers
People from Parwan Province